Satria means knight or warrior in Indonesian language. Satria may refer to:

People
Satria Tama Hardiyanto (born 1997), Indonesian footballer
Bobby Satria (born 1986), Indonesian footballer
Satria gens, minor plebeian family in ancient Rome

Products
Proton Satria, hatchback automobile produced by Malaysian manufacturer Proton from 1994 to 2005
Proton Satria R3, limited edition, track-focused version of Proton's Satria hatchback made by R3
Suzuki Satria, underbone motorcycle manufactured by Suzuki, first released as a 2-stroke in Indonesia in 1997

Other 
 Satria Stadium, a sports stadium located in Purwokerto, Central Java, Indonesia
 Satria, a planned communications satellite by PT Pasifik Satelit Nusantara

See also
Sartoria
Sataria
Sathria
Satra
Sattriya
Saturia
Sauteria